Edward Robert Woodward (1863 – 11 May 1931) was a British barrister who was clerk to the City of London Guardians until 1930. In his spare time he was a noted philatelist who was added to the Roll of Distinguished Philatelists retrospectively in 1951. He was president of the City of London Philatelic Society.

References

Signatories to the Roll of Distinguished Philatelists
1863 births
1931 deaths
British philatelists
Fellows of the Royal Philatelic Society London
British barristers